Forkhead box protein A1 (FOXA1), also known as hepatocyte nuclear factor 3-alpha (HNF-3A), is a protein that in humans is encoded by the FOXA1 gene.

Function 

FOXA1 is a member of the forkhead class of DNA-binding proteins. These hepatocyte nuclear factors are transcriptional activators for liver-specific transcripts such as albumin and transthyretin, and they also interact with chromatin as a pioneer factor. Similar family members in mice have roles in the regulation of metabolism and in the differentiation of the pancreas and liver.

Marker in breast cancer 

FOXA1 in breast cancer is highly correlated with ERα+, GATA3+, and PR+ protein expression as well as endocrine signaling. FOXA1 acts as a pioneer factor for ERa in ERα+ breast cancer, and its expression might identify ERα+ cancers that undergo rapid reprogramming of ERa signaling that is associated with poor outcomes and treatment resistance. Conversely, in ERα− breast cancer FOXA1 is highly correlated with low-grade morphology and improved disease free survival. FOXA1 is a downstream target of GATA3 in the mammary gland. Expression in ERα− cancers may identify a subset of tumors that is responsive to other endocrine therapies such as androgen receptor antagonist treatment.

Role in cancer 
Mutations in this gene have been recurrently seen in instances of prostate cancer.

Expression of FOXA1 correlates with two EMT markers, namely Twist1 and E-cadherin in breast cancer.

References

Further reading

External links 

Forkhead transcription factors